The Striplin Lone Ranger is a family of American ultralight aircraft that was designed by Ken Striplin. The aircraft was supplied as a kit for amateur construction.

Design and development
It features a high-wing, a single-seat, open cockpit, tricycle landing gear and a single engine in tractor configuration.

The Lone Ranger was  designed to overcome pitch stability problems found in the earlier Striplin FLAC tailless aircraft. Stability was increased with the addition of a conventional tail unit, including conventional elevators and a rudder for control. Because they were no longer needed the FLAC's wing tip rudders were deleted. The landing gear is of tricycle configuration and features a steerable nosewheel. The engine is mounted above the wing, with the propeller above and in front of the windshield. The design spawned a family of variants featuring one and two seats, as well as strut-braced and cantilever wings.

Variants
Striplin Lone Ranger
Initial version for US production. Early versions have dual wing struts, while later models have just one strut.
Aero and Engineering Services Lone Ranger
Cantilever wing version produced by Aero and Engineering Services of the United Kingdom. Empty weight , gross weight , glide ratio of 17:1.
Silver Cloud
Improved version with a cantilever wing and full-span flaperons.
Sky Ranger
Two seat version of the Lone Ranger.
Silver Cloud II
Two seat version of the Silver Cloud.

Specifications (Silver Cloud)

References

External links
Image of Aero and Engineering Services Lone Ranger

1980s United States ultralight aircraft
Homebuilt aircraft
Single-engined tractor aircraft
High-wing aircraft
Lone Ranger